The Joint Helicopter Support Squadron (JHSS) is a joint organisation of the British Army and the Royal Air Force, located at RAF Benson in Oxfordshire.

History 

Following the introduction of the Boeing Chinook HC.1, the unit was formed in July 1982 during the Falklands War as the Joint Helicopter Support Unit (JHSU). Personnel were drawn from the Royal Corps of Transport and Royal Army Ordnance Corps (both now amalgamated into the Royal Logistic Corps) plus the Royal Corps of Signals and the Royal Air Force. After the war the unit was officially formed at RAF Odiham in Hampshire and RAF Gütersloh in Germany. 

In September 2009, the unit became the Joint Helicopter Support Squadron (JHSS) following its merger with the RAF's Mobile Air Operations Team (MAOT). 

During 2016 the squadron moved from RAF Odiham to RAF Benson in Oxfordshire.

Role and operations 
The squadron is tasked with providing a ground support capability to Joint Helicopter Command's support helicopter force, including specialist skills in under-slung load operations and preparation of landing sites. It has two teams on very high readiness which are able to contribute to contingent operations at short notice, such as natural disaster relief.

References

External links 
 

Military units and formations of the British Army
Squadrons of the Royal Air Force
Helicopter units and formations
1982 establishments in the United Kingdom
Military units and formations established in 1982